Osteria la Spiga is a Black-owned Italian restaurant on Seattle's Capitol Hill, in the U.S. state of Washington. The business was established in 1998.  Sabrina Tinsley is a co-owner and chef.

Reception 
Allecia Vermillion included the restaurant in Seattle Metropolitan's 2021 list of the best restaurant on Capitol Hill. She also included Osteria la Spiga in a 2022 overview of the city's best Italian food.

See also 

 List of Black-owned restaurants
 List of Italian restaurants

References

External links 
 
 
 Osteria la Spiga at Zomato

1998 establishments in Washington (state)
Black-owned restaurants in the United States
Capitol Hill, Seattle
Italian restaurants in Seattle
Restaurants established in 1998